Kaga is a Local Government Area of Borno State, Nigeria. Its headquarters are in the town of Benisheikh.
 
It has an area of 2,700  km and a population of 90,015 at the 2006 census.

The postal code of the area is 601.

It is one of the sixteen LGAs that constitute the Borno Emirate, a traditional state located in Borno State, Nigeria.

References

Local Government Areas in Borno State